The British National Films Company was formed in England in 1934 by J. Arthur Rank, Lady Annie Henrietta Yule of Bricket Wood, and producer John Corfield.

Origin
Joseph Arthur Rank was a devout member of the British Methodist Church and the son of a millionaire flour miller. On the first day of the week, he was a Sunday school teacher, and he discovered that if he screened religious films instead of lecturing his class, he got a positive response.

His idea spread to other classes held by other churches, and in 1933 this motivated Rank to form the Religious Film Society to distribute the films that he wanted to show to other Sunday schools.

Following distribution, Rank then decided to go into the business of producing religious films. Mastership was his first religious film production. It was a twenty-minute film made at Merton Park Studios at a cost of £2,700. Mastership was never shown commercially because it was merely intended as a form of evangelism and shown within other churches. Rank was pleased with the results, and other films went into production in Elstree at the better-equipped Rock Studios, which were later renamed British National.

Press challenge
In the 1930s, the Methodist Times newspaper in England began attacking the low moral standards exhibited by British films and by American films shown in Britain. In response, the London Evening News answered the Methodist Times by suggesting that if the Methodist Church was so concerned about the effect that the film industry was having upon family life in Britain, it should start producing its own family-friendly films. It was this exchange that motivated Rank to expand his movie interests into the commercial market.

Lady Yule
A young producer named John Corfield introduced Rank to Lady Annie Henrietta Yule of Bricket Wood, who was both extremely wealthy and extremely bored with life. In order to fill her life with activity, she engaged in big game hunting and breeding Arabian horses with a degree of success and lasting fame; her Hanstead Stud won international recognition. She also commissioned luxury yachts, including the Nahlin, which she chartered in 1936 to the new king, Edward VIII. Upon meeting Rank, she decided to add the making of films to her list. However, when it came to the business side of film production, Lady Yule did not share the same ideas as Rank with regard to making and distributing films to improve society; she did not believe in giving discounts to religiously motivated film productions. She thought that films were an interesting hobby and similar to her financial interests in Arabian horse breeding.

Formation of the company
In 1934, Rank, Lady Yule and John Corfield formed the British National Films Company and went into production in answer to the challenge by the "Evening News".

British National's first feature film was "Turn of the Tide", which was released in 1935. The script was based upon a 1932 novel by Leo Walmsley called "Three Fevers". The setting, which Rank knew from childhood, was Robin Hood's Bay on the north coast of Yorkshire, England. Having read the book, Rank decided that it would make an excellent family-friendly British film in answer to the Hollywood-style movies that Alexander Korda was making at the Denham Film Studios.

Although "Turn of the Tide" featured a good cast, British National were unable to gain wide distribution for the film, and when they did, it was as the second half of a double feature. The company struggled to recoup its costs. Rank knew that for British National to make a profit, he had to create a commercial version of his Religious Film Society to control distribution and exhibition.

Pinewood Film Studios
In 1934, Charles Boot had undertaken to construct a new film studio in the village of Iver Heath in Buckinghamshire. His location was set among the pine trees on the estate grounds of a mansion called Heatherden Hall that Boot had recently bought at auction. The complex was named Pinewood Film Studios and was completed within a year. By 1935, Boot had approached British National about taking over ownership and management of the new studios, and a contract was entered into. Corfield eventually resigned from the board of Pinewood Film Studios, and Lady Yule sold her shares to Rank.

Film distribution
The problems that British National experienced in distributing Turn of the Tide were eventually solved by Rank.

See also
 List of British National films

Film production companies of the United Kingdom
Entertainment companies established in 1934
1934 establishments in the United Kingdom